The U.S. federal district of Washington, D.C., first required its residents to register their motor vehicles in 1903. Registrants provided their own license plates for display until 1907, when the district began to issue plates. Plates are issued by the District of Columbia Department of Motor Vehicles (DC DMV). Front and rear plates are required for most classes of vehicles, while only rear plates are required for motorcycles and trailers.

Passenger baseplates

1907 to 1966
The first Washington, D.C. license plate that complied with these standards was issued three years beforehand, in 1953 (dated March 31, 1954).

1966 to present
Since November 2000, the standard Washington, D.C. license plate design has featured some form of the slogan "Taxation Without Representation", referring to the unique circumstance that the district's residents face, in which they must pay federal income tax but cannot elect a voting member of the United States Congress.

Non-passenger plates

Optional plates

Special event plates

Presidential inaugurations

Mayoral inaugurations

Political types

Notes

References

External links
District of Columbia License Plates, Permits, and Vehicle Registration History
Washington, D.C. license plates, 1969–present

 Washington, D.C.
Washington, D.C., transportation-related lists
Transportation in Washington, D.C.